Kwilu-Ngongo Airport  is an airport serving the city of Kwilu-Ngongo in Kongo Central Province, Democratic Republic of the Congo.

See also

 Transport in the Democratic Republic of the Congo
 List of airports in the Democratic Republic of the Congo

References

External links
 OpenStreetMap - Kwilu
 OurAirports - Kwilu-Ngongo
 FallingRain - Kwilu-Ngongo
 

Airports in Kongo Central Province